Arabian Television Network (ATN) was a Dubai, United Arab Emirates-based broadcast media company, part of Arab Media Group. Its staff and resources have been merged into Dubai Media Incorporated.

Arabian Television Network had partnered with MTV Networks International of Viacom to launch a localized version of MTV, called MTV Arabia, and Nickelodeon Arabia as well as launching the first user-generated content channel, SHOOFtv.

See also 
 Arab Media Group
 Viacom

References

External links
 Arab Media Group

Mass media companies of the United Arab Emirates
Mass media in Dubai
Government-owned companies of the United Arab Emirates
Mass media companies established in 2007
2007 establishments in the United Arab Emirates
Arab mass media